In mathematics, the -adic number system for any prime number  extends the ordinary arithmetic of the rational numbers in a different way from the extension of the rational number system to the real and complex number systems. The extension is achieved by an alternative interpretation of the concept of "closeness" or absolute value. In particular, two -adic numbers are considered to be close when their difference is divisible by a high power of : the higher the power, the closer they are. This property enables -adic numbers to encode congruence information in a way that turns out to have powerful applications in number theory – including, for example, in the famous proof of Fermat's Last Theorem by Andrew Wiles.

These numbers were first described by Kurt Hensel in 1897, though, with hindsight, some of Ernst Kummer's earlier work can be interpreted as implicitly using -adic numbers. The -adic numbers were motivated primarily by an attempt to bring the ideas and techniques of power series methods into number theory. Their influence now extends far beyond this. For example, the field of -adic analysis essentially provides an alternative form of calculus.

More formally, for a given prime , the field  of -adic numbers is a completion of the rational numbers. The field  is also given a topology derived from a metric, which is itself derived from the -adic order, an alternative valuation on the rational numbers.

The  in "-adic" is a variable and may be replaced with a prime (yielding, for instance, "the 2-adic numbers") or another expression representing a prime number. The "adic" of "-adic" comes from the ending found in words such as dyadic or triadic.

p-adic expansion of rational numbers 

The decimal expansion of a positive rational number  is its representation as a series

The -adic expansion of a rational number is defined similarly, but with a different division step. The division step consists of writing

obtained by repeating indefinitely the above division step on successive remainders. In a -adic expansion, all  are integers such that 

The existence and the computation of the -adic expansion of a rational number results from Bézout's identity in the following way.

with 
This gives the division step as 

so that in the iteration

is the new rational number.

The uniqueness of the division step and of the whole -adic expansion is easy: if  one has  This means  divides  Since  and  the following must be true:  and  Thus, one gets  and since  divides  it must be that 

The -adic expansion of a rational number is a series that converges to the rational number, if one applies the definition of a convergent series with the -adic absolute value.
In the standard -adic notation, the digits are written in the same order as in a standard base- system, namely with the powers of the base increasing to the left. This means that the production of the digits is reversed and the limit happens on the left hand side.

The -adic expansion of a rational number is eventually periodic. Conversely, a series  with  converges (for the -adic absolute value) to a rational number if and only if it is eventually periodic; in this case, the series is the -adic expansion of that rational number. The proof is similar to that of the similar result for repeating decimals.

Example
Thus

For the next step, one has to "divide"  (the factor 5 in the numerator of the fraction has to be viewed as a "shift" of the -adic valuation, and thus it is not involved in the "division").  Multiplying Bézout's identity by  gives

The "integer part"  is not in the right interval.

and

Similarly, one has 

and

Or in the standard 5-adic notation

with the ellipsis  on the left hand side.

p-adic series
In this article, given a prime number , a -adic series is a formal series of the form

A -adic series is normalized if each  is an integer in the interval  So, the -adic expansion of a rational number is a normalized -adic series.

The -adic valuation, or -adic order of a nonzero -adic series is the lowest integer  such that  The order of the zero series is infinity 

Two -adic series are equivalent if they have the same order , and if for every integer  the difference between their partial sums

In particular, every rational number can be considered as a -adic series with a single nonzero term, and the normalization of this series is exactly the rational representation of the rational number.

In other words, the equivalence of -adic series is an equivalence relation, and each equivalence class contains exactly one normalized -adic series.

The usual operations of series (addition, subtraction, multiplication, division) map -adic series to -adic series, and are compatible with equivalence of -adic series.

Moreover,  and  have the same order, and the same first term.

Positional notation 
It is possible to use a positional notation similar to that which is used to represent numbers in base .

So, the computation of the example above shows that 

and 

When  a separating dot is added before the digits with negative index, and, if the index  is present, it appears just after the separating dot. For example,

and

If a -adic representation is finite on the left (that is,  for large values of ), then it has the value of a nonnegative rational number of the form  with  integers. These rational numbers are exactly the nonnegative rational numbers that have a finite representation in base . For these rational numbers, the two representations are the same.

Definition 
There are several equivalent definitions of -adic numbers. The one that is given here is relatively elementary, since it does not involve any other mathematical concepts than those introduced in the preceding sections. Other equivalent definitions use completion of a discrete valuation ring (see ), completion of a metric space (see ), or inverse limits (see ).

A -adic number can be defined as a normalized -adic series. Since there are other equivalent definitions that are commonly used, one says often that a normalized -adic series represents a -adic number, instead of saying that it is a -adic number.

One can say also that any -adic series represents a -adic number, since every -adic series is equivalent to a unique normalized -adic series. This is useful for defining operations (addition, subtraction, multiplication, division) of -adic numbers: the result of such an operation is obtained by normalizing the result of the corresponding operation on series. This well defines operations on -adic numbers, since the series operations are compatible with equivalence of -adic series.

With these operations, -adic numbers form a field called the field of -adic numbers and denoted  or  There is a unique field homomorphism from the rational numbers into the -adic numbers, which maps a rational number to its -adic expansion. The image of this homomorphism is commonly identified with the field of rational numbers. This allows considering the -adic numbers as an extension field of the rational numbers, and the rational numbers as a subfield of the -adic numbers.

By convention,  that is, the valuation of zero is  This valuation is a discrete valuation.

p-adic integers 
The -adic integers are the -adic numbers with a nonnegative valuation. 

A -adic integer can be represented as a sequence

 

Every integer is a -adic integer (including zero, since ).

 It is an integral domain, since it is a subring of a field, or since the first term of the series representation of the product of two non zero -adic series is the product of their first terms.
 It is a discrete valuation ring, since this results from the preceding properties.

Topological properties 
The -adic valuation allows defining an absolute value on -adic numbers: the -adic absolute value of a nonzero -adic number  is

  if and only if 
   

Moreover, if  one has 

This makes the -adic numbers a metric space, and even an ultrametric space, with the -adic distance defined by

As a metric space, the -adic numbers form the completion of the rational numbers equipped with the -adic absolute value. This provides another way for defining the -adic numbers. However, the general construction of a completion can be simplified in this case, because the metric is defined by a discrete valuation (in short, one can extract from every Cauchy sequence a subsequence such that the differences between two consecutive terms have strictly decreasing absolute values; such a subsequence is the sequence of the partial sums of a -adic series, and thus a unique normalized -adic series can be associated to every equivalence class of Cauchy sequences; so, for building the completion, it suffices to consider normalized -adic series instead of equivalence classes of Cauchy sequences).

As the metric is defined from a discrete valuation, every open ball is also closed. More precisely, the open ball  equals the closed ball   where  is the least integer such that  Similarly,  where  is the greatest integer such that 

This implies that the -adic numbers form a locally compact space, and the -adic integers—that is, the ball —form a compact space.

Modular properties 

This definition of -adic integers is specially useful for practical computations, as allowing building -adic integers by successive approximations. 

For example, for computing the -adic (multiplicative) inverse of an integer, one can use Newton's method, starting from the inverse modulo ; then, each Newton step computes the inverse modulo  from the inverse modulo  

The same method can be used for computing the -adic square root of an integer that is a quadratic residue modulo . Applying Newton's method to find the square root requires  to be larger than twice the given integer, which is quickly satisfied.

This is commonly used by polynomial factorization algorithms.

Notation
There are several different conventions for writing -adic expansions. So far this article has used a notation for -adic expansions in which powers of  increase from right to left.

When performing arithmetic in this notation, digits are carried to the left. It is also possible to write -adic expansions so that the powers of  increase from left to right, and digits are carried to the right.

-adic expansions may be written with other sets of digits instead of {0, 1, ..., }. For example, the 3-adic expansion of 1/5 can be written using balanced ternary digits {1,0,1} as

In fact any set of  integers which are in distinct residue classes modulo  may be used as -adic digits. In number theory, Teichmüller representatives are sometimes used as digits.

 is a variant of the -adic representation of rational numbers that was proposed in 1979 by Eric Hehner and Nigel Horspool for implementing on computers the (exact) arithmetic with these numbers.

Cardinality

Algebraic closure
 contains  and is a field of characteristic .

Because  can be written as sum of squares,  cannot be turned into an ordered field.

 has only a single proper algebraic extension: ; in other words, this quadratic extension is already algebraically closed. Also contrasting the case of real numbers, although there is a unique extension of the -adic valuation to  the latter is not (metrically) complete. However unlike  this field is not locally compact.

The proof of existence of such a field isomorphism relies on the axiom of choice, and does not provide an explicit example of such an isomorphism (that is, it is not constructive).

Thus, the Galois group  is prosolvable.

Multiplicative group
 contains the -th cyclotomic field if and only if .

The number , defined as the sum of reciprocals of factorials, is not a member of any -adic field; but . For  one must take at least the fourth power.

Local–global principle
Helmut Hasse's local–global principle is said to hold for an equation if it can be solved over the rational numbers if and only if it can be solved over the real numbers and over the -adic numbers for every prime . This principle holds, for example, for equations given by quadratic forms, but fails for higher polynomials in several indeterminates.

Rational arithmetic with Hensel lifting

Generalizations and related concepts 
The reals and the -adic numbers are the completions of the rationals; it is also possible to complete other fields, for instance general algebraic number fields, in an analogous way. This will be described now.

Suppose D is a Dedekind domain and E is its field of fractions. Pick a non-zero prime ideal P of D. If x is a non-zero element of E, then xD is a fractional ideal and can be uniquely factored as a product of positive and negative powers of non-zero prime ideals of D. We write ordP(x) for the exponent of P in this factorization, and for any choice of number c greater than 1 we can set

Completing with respect to this absolute value | . |P yields a field EP, the proper generalization of the field of p-adic numbers to this setting. The choice of c does not change the completion (different choices yield the same concept of Cauchy sequence, so the same completion). It is convenient, when the residue field D/P is finite, to take for c the size of D/P.

For example, when E is a number field, Ostrowski's theorem says that every non-trivial non-Archimedean absolute value on E arises as some | . |P. The remaining non-trivial absolute values on E arise from the different embeddings of E into the real or complex numbers. (In fact, the non-Archimedean absolute values can be considered as simply the different embeddings of E into the fields Cp, thus putting the description of all
the non-trivial absolute values of a number field on a common footing.)

Often, one needs to simultaneously keep track of all the above-mentioned completions when E is a number field (or more generally a global field), which are seen as encoding "local" information. This is accomplished by adele rings and idele groups.

p-adic integers can be extended to p-adic solenoids .

See also

 Non-archimedean
 p-adic quantum mechanics
 p-adic Hodge theory
 p-adic Teichmuller theory
 p-adic analysis
 1 + 2 + 4 + 8 + ...
 k-adic notation
 C-minimal theory
 Hensel's lemma
 Locally compact field
 Mahler's theorem
 Profinite integer
 Volkenborn integral

Footnotes

Notes

Citations

References

. — Translation into English by John Stillwell of Theorie der algebraischen Functionen einer Veränderlichen (1882).

Further reading

External links

p-adic number at Springer On-line Encyclopaedia of Mathematics
Completion of Algebraic Closure – on-line lecture notes by Brian Conrad
An Introduction to p-adic Numbers and p-adic Analysis - on-line lecture notes by Andrew Baker, 2007
Efficient p-adic arithmetic (slides)
Introduction to p-adic numbers

Field (mathematics)
Number theory